Memil-muk or buckwheat jelly is a light gray-brown muk (jelly) made from buckwheat starch. It is commonly served as banchan (a side dish accompanying rice) as well as anju (food accompanying alcoholic drinks). 

In post-war Korea, from the mid to late-20th century, memil-muk along with chapssal-tteok (glutinous rice cakes) was widely served as yasik (late-night snack) by street vendors. In modern times, it is popular as a diet food.

Along with other buckwheat dishes, it is a local specialty of Gangwon Province, especially Bongpyeong Township in Pyeongchang County.

Preparation 
Unhulled whole buckwheat grains are soaked in water (to reduce bitterness). Soaked grains are then ground in maetdol (millstone) and sieved. The skins are discarded, and the remaining liquid is set aside to allow it to separate into layers. The upper layer, consisting of clear water, is discarded. The lower layer, consisting of settled buckwheat starch, is boiled with constant stirring. When cooled, the mixture sets to form a jelly-like substance, muk.

Memil-muk is most commonly eaten as memil-muk-muchim ("buckwheat jelly salad"), a banchan (side dish) in which chunks of memil-muk are mixed with chopped kimchi, ground toasted sesame seeds and soy sauce. In Gangwon Province, memil-muk is used in jesa (ancestral rites) for deceased ancestors. In summer, memil-muk-sabal ("cold buckwheat jelly soup") is made with cold kimchi broth, while in winter, memil-muk is served in hot jangguk (soy sauce-based beef broth).

In Yeongju, some houses are still made in the traditional way and eat Muk-bap(묵밥).

In folklore 
In ancient times, memil-muk was thought to be irresistible to dokkaebi (Korean goblins).

Memil-muk is offered in dokkaebi-gut, a gut (shamanistic ritual performed by a mu shaman) for chasing away dokkaebi, which were believed to be the causes of contagious diseases. Other rituals with similar purpose, such as dokkaebi-je, a jesa (Confucian ritual, held in households), and dokkaebi-gosa, a gosa (shamanistic or Buddhist household ritual, held in households), also include the offering of memil-muk.

In popular culture 
In the manhwa Dokebi Bride, the use of memil-muk to call on dokebi is an important plot device.

Gallery

See also 
 Dotori-muk, acorn jelly
 Nokdu-muk, mung bean jelly
 Konnyaku, Japanese konjac jelly
 List of buckwheat dishes

References 

Buckwheat dishes
Muk (food)